Linda May French is an American astronomer specializing in the physical properties of asteroids and comets, including their shapes and surfaces. She is also interested in astronomy education and in the history of astronomy, particularly focusing on the life of John Goodricke, an 18th-century deaf British amateur astronomer. She is a professor of physics at Illinois Wesleyan University.

Education and career
French is originally from Hagerstown, Indiana, and first made plans for becoming an astronomer at age five, after being given a children's book on astronomy. But as a student at Indiana University, she went through English and education majors before returning to astronomy after taking a junior-year general education course in the subject. She graduated from Indiana University in 1973, with an A.B. in astronomy and a minor in physics. She then went to Cornell University for graduate study in astronomy, where she worked as a teaching assistant for Carl Sagan, earned a master's degree in 1977, and completed her Ph.D. in 1980.

After a one-year visiting assistant professorship at Bates College, she was a postdoctoral researcher and lecturer at the Massachusetts Institute of Technology from 1982 to 1988, a researcher at the Air Force Geophysics Laboratory at Hanscom Air Force Base in Massachusetts from 1988 to 1989, and a pre-secondary science teacher at The Park School in Brookline, Massachusetts from 1989 to 1992, before returning to academia as an associate professor of physics at Wheelock College in Boston in 1992. She moved to Illinois Wesleyan University in 2002, and was promoted to full professor in 2008.

She was a program director at the National Science Foundation for a three-year term beginning circa 2017.

Recognition
Asteroid 3506 French was named after French in 1988. In 2016, Illinois Wesleyan University gave her their highest teaching award, the Kemp Foundation Award for Teaching Excellence. French was named a Legacy Fellow of the American Astronomical Society in 2020.

References

External links
Home page
Dr. Linda French: Don’t limit yourself, interview by Kelsi Singer, September 2015, Women in Planetary Science

Year of birth missing (living people)
Living people
American astronomers
American women astronomers
Indiana University alumni
Cornell University alumni
Wheelock College alumni
Illinois Wesleyan University faculty
Fellows of the American Astronomical Society